The 1987 Labbatt's Canadian Masters was a professional non-ranking snooker tournament that took place between 27 and 31 October 1987 at the CBC Television Studios in Toronto, Canada.

Dennis Taylor won the tournament by defeating Jimmy White 9–7 in the final.

Main draw

References

Canadian Masters (snooker)
Canadian Masters
Canadian Masters
Canadian Masters